5th Reserve Division() was formed in August 1955 in Chengdu Military Region. On February 15, 1956, the division moved to Nanchong, Sichuan.

As of its activation the division was composed of:
13th Reserve Regiment;
14th Reserve Regiment;
15th Reserve Regiment;
Artillery Regiment;
Anti-Aircraft Artillery Regiment;
Sergeant Training Regiment.

The division was fully manned and equipped. During its short-lived existence the division was focused on the training of officers and sergeants.

In March 1958 the division was demobilized, moving to Heilongjiang for agricultural missions.

References

R05
Military units and formations disestablished in 1958
Military units and formations established in 1955
Reserve divisions of the People's Liberation Army